The large majority of works racing motorcycles manufactured by the motorcycle racing division of Honda of Japan, currently called Honda Racing Corporation (HRC, previously called the Racing Service Center), carry the iconic prefix RC.

History of the RC name
Use of the RC name stretches from Honda's entry onto the international motorcycle Grand Prix stage in 1959 to the present day. In recent years Honda has also used the RC prefix as a marketing device and applied it to certain production motorcycles that had been created for racing homologation purposes. For works Motocross bikes, there was an additional M suffix.

In the late 1980s, Honda began to enter its production motorcycles in various Superbike, or production-based, racing series, such as the new FIM Superbike World Championship.  The most successful of these was the VFR750R, which eventually became better known by its model number, RC30. However, the VFR750R was a Honda production motorcycle, not an HRC race bike, and the fact that its model number also began with the "RC" prefix was a coincidence, rather than a continuation of the HRC model naming tradition.

List of Honda HRC racing motorcycles

References

External links

 50 Years of World Championship Racing official site
 First hand account of Honda's entry in the 1959 Isle of Man TT Race

Honda racing motorcycles
Six-cylinder motorcycles